Leonard Phillip Hatzenbeller Jr. (born May 6, 1959) is an American former basketball center. In college, he competed for Drexel. He was both an honorable mention All-American and the East Coast Conference Player of the Year in 1981.

A native of Philadelphia, Pennsylvania, Hatzenbeller attended Cardinal Dougherty High School in Philadelphia before transferring to William Tennent High School in Warminster. As a senior he averaged approximately 21 points and 15 rebounds per game. Hatzenbeller received a scholarship to play for nearby Drexel University, where from 1977 to 1981 he set eight then-school records, including the single season marks for scoring average (21.4), points (589) and field goals (214). He was honored as a first-team all-East Coast Conference (ECC) player as a senior along with the All-American and conference player of the year honors.

After graduation, Hatzenbeller was selected in the 1981 NBA draft by the Indiana Pacers (8th round, 174th overall) but never played in the league. In 1981–82 he competed for a professional team in Uppsala, Sweden before returning to the United States. In December 1982 he was one of the final cuts of the Continental Basketball Association's Rochester Zeniths.

In 1988, Hatzenbeller was inducted into Drexel's athletics hall of fame.

References

External links
Len Hatzenbeller @ basketball-reference.com
Len Hatzenbeller @ sports-reference.com

1959 births
Living people
American expatriate basketball people in Sweden
American men's basketball players
Basketball players from Pennsylvania
Centers (basketball)
Drexel Dragons men's basketball players
Indiana Pacers draft picks
People from Warminster, Pennsylvania